Diceros (Greek: "two" (dio), "horn" (keratos)) is a genus of rhinoceros containing the living black rhinoceros (Diceros bicornis) and at least one extinct species.

Taxonomy
Diceros is generally believed to have branched off from an early species of Ceratotherium, specifically C. neumayri. However an even older species than C. neumayri from the Miocene has been placed in Diceros (D.australis). D. praecox is considered the direct ancestor of the black rhinoceros.

References

External links
 
 

Rhinoceroses
Mammal genera
Mammal genera with one living species
Taxa named by John Edward Gray
Taxa described in 1821